John Francis Grady (May 23, 1929  – December 2, 2019) was a United States district judge of the United States District Court for the Northern District of Illinois.

Education and career

Born in Chicago, Illinois, Grady attended Lake Forest Academy, a nationally known private school for boys, and graduated in 1948. He subsequently received a Bachelor of Science degree from Northwestern University in 1952 and a Juris Doctor from Northwestern University Pritzker School of Law in 1954. He was in private practice in Chicago from 1954 to 1956. He was Chief of the Criminal Division in the Office of the United States Attorney for the Northern District of Illinois from 1956 to 1961. He returned to private practice in Waukegan, Illinois from 1961 to 1976.

Federal judicial service

On October 20, 1975, Grady was nominated by President Gerald Ford to a seat on the United States District Court for the Northern District of Illinois vacated by Judge Edwin Albert Robson. Grady was confirmed by the United States Senate on November 20, 1975, and received his commission on November 21, 1975. He served as Chief Judge from 1986 to 1990, and assumed senior status on May 23, 1994. He took inactive senior status on January 30, 2015. His service terminated on December 2, 2019, due to his death at his home in Wilmette, Illinois.

References

Sources
 

1929 births
2019 deaths
Assistant United States Attorneys
Judges of the United States District Court for the Northern District of Illinois
Lake Forest Academy alumni
Northwestern University alumni
Northwestern University Pritzker School of Law alumni
United States district court judges appointed by Gerald Ford
20th-century American judges